Southern Health-Santé Sud (SH-SS) is the governing body responsible for healthcare delivery and regulation for the eponymous health region in southern Manitoba—covering southeastern and south-central Manitoba, in particular.

Southern Health-Santé Sud is one of 5 regional health authorities (RHAs) in Manitoba and is a designated bilingual RHA. It was formed in 2012 by the merger of the former South Eastman Health/Santé Sud-Est and Regional Health Authority - Central Manitoba Health Authorities.

The region includes: 20 rural municipalities, 7 municipalities, 4 cities, 4 towns, 1 village, and 1 unorganized territory; as well as 7 First Nation communities, 61 Hutterite colonies, and various other cultures and communities such as Métis, Francophone and Mennonite.

Just as for the other RHAs, the board of directors SH-SS are appointed by the provincial Minister of Health, Seniors and Active Living and in accordance with the Regional Health Authorities Act. SH-SS has 4 regional offices, located in La Broquerie, Morden, Notre Dame de Lourdes, and Southport.

Communities 
The region serves 20 rural municipalities, 7 municipalities, 4 cities, 5 towns, 1 village, and 1 unorganized territory; as well as 7 First Nation communities, 61 Hutterite colonies, and various other cultures and communities such as Métis, Francophone and Mennonite.

Southern Health-Santé Sud is a designated bilingual RHA, and 11% of the region's population speak French "well enough to conduct a conversation." In 2019/2020, there were 350 designated bilingual positions in SH-SS (of 602 total) held by bilingual employees.

Southern Health-Santé Sud's region includes the following:

Municipalities / Rural Municipalities (27)
Alonsa
De Salaberry
Dufferin
Emerson – Franklin
Grey
Hanover
Headingley
La Broquerie
Lorne
Louise
Macdonald
Morris
Montcalm
North Norfolk
Pembina
Piney
Portage la Prairie
Rhineland
Ritchot
Roland
Stanley
St. Francois Xavier
Ste. Anne
Stuartburn
Tache
Thompson
WestLake – Gladstone
Cities (4)
Morden
Portage la Prairie
Steinbach
Winkler
Towns (5)
Altona
Carman
Morris
Niverville
Ste. Anne

Villages (1)
St. Pierre-Jolys

Other
Whiteshell Provincial Park (south)

Indigenous 
13% of the population identify as Indigenous in Southern Health-Santé Sud—which includes 7 First Nation communities and a significant number of Métis communities. The region's First Nations communities are:

 Buffalo Point First Nation
 Dakota Plains Wahpeton First Nation
 Dakota Tipi First Nation
 Long Plain First Nation
 Roseau River Anishinabe First Nation
 Sandy Bay Ojibway First Nation
 Swan Lake First Nation

In 2016, Southern Health-Santé Sud signed an Indigenous Health Partnership Agreement with Dakota Ojibway Tribal Council, First Nations Inuit Health Branch, Dakota Tipi First Nation, Long Plain First Nation, Roseau River Anishinabe First Nation, Sandy Bay Ojibway First Nation, and Swan Lake First Nation.

Facilities 
Southern Health-Santé Sud includes 18 health centres, 18 mental health sites, 15 telehealth sites, 20 EMS sites, 19 home care sites, 22 personal care homes, and 37 clinics.

The three regional health centres (RHCs) of Southern Health-Santé Sud are Bethesda Regional Health Centre, Boundary Trails Health Centre, and Portage District General Hospital. In total, SH-SS has 456 acute care beds, among which 255 belong to the RHCs.

Health statistics

On 18 March 2020, the Southern Health-Santé Sud region discovered its first cases of COVID-19. Two days later, Southern Health's first regional COVID-19 community testing site was opened in Steinbach. The region's second site opened in Winkler on March 25, and the third in Portage la Prairie on March 27.

As almost 2,000 adults have a diagnosis of chronic kidney disease in the region—and, of those, 180 have end stage kidney disease—Southern Health is projected to experience the highest increase in the province in people living with end stage kidney disease by 2024 and, as such, the highest increase for renal therapies (e.g. hemodialysis, kidney transplants) by 2024. Additionally, the prevalence of diabetes in SH-SS has increased over time, going from 6.3% through 2009/10–2011/12 to 7.3% in 2014/15–2016/17. The region also ranks lowest in Manitoba for several childhood vaccines (Diphtheria, Tetanus, Pertussis, and HPV) among youth aged 17 years who received the recommended doses.

In their 2019/2020 annual report, Southern Health-Santé Sud was found to have a life expectancy among the highest in the province. From 2012–2016, the average life expectancy for males was 79.4 years in SH-SS and 78.5 years in Manitoba; for females, it was 83.9 years in SH-SS and 82.8 years in Manitoba.

Former regions
Southern Health-Santé Sud was formed in 2012 by the merger of two former regional health authorities.

Regional Health Authority - Central Manitoba Inc. (or Central Region) was the health authority for the south-central region of Manitoba, with its regional office located in Southport, Manitoba.

Serving 37 municipalities and various communities, it was the most populated of Manitoba's rural and northern regions, with 8.5% of the province’s total population. In 2010, the region had 14 acute care sites, 15 personal care homes, 13 home care offices, 15 public health units, 11 mental health offices, and 14 ambulance stations.

South Eastman Health/Santé Sud-Est Inc. was the health authority for the southern Eastman region of Manitoba, and was based in La Broquerie.

South Eastman owned and operated the region’s 4 hospitals, which were located in St. Pierre-Jolys, Ste. Anne, Steinbach, and Vita; it also had two primary health care centres, located in Sprague and Niverville

References

Notes

External links
 Southern Health-Santé Sud website
Map of Southern Health-Santé Sud
Government of Manitoba - Regional Health Authorities
Archived sites
 South Eastman Health/Santé Sud-Est Inc. website
 Regional Health Authority - Central Manitoba Inc. website

Health regions of Manitoba